In software engineering, the composite pattern is a partitioning design pattern. The composite pattern describes a group of objects that are treated the same way as a single instance of the same type of object. The intent of a composite is to "compose" objects into tree structures to represent part-whole hierarchies. Implementing the composite pattern lets clients treat individual objects and compositions uniformly.

Overview
The Composite

design pattern is one of the twenty-three well-known 
GoF design patterns 
that describe how to solve recurring design problems to design flexible and reusable object-oriented software, that is, objects that are easier to implement, change, test, and reuse.

What problems can the Composite design pattern solve?

 A part-whole hierarchy should be represented so that  clients can treat part and whole objects uniformly.
 A part-whole hierarchy should be represented as tree structure.

When defining (1) Part objects and (2) Whole objects that act as containers for Part objects, clients must treat them separately, which complicates client code.

What solution does the Composite design pattern describe?

 Define a unified Component interface for both part (Leaf) objects and whole (Composite) objects.
 Individual Leaf objects implement the Component interface directly, and Composite objects forward requests to their child components.

This enables clients to work through the Component interface to treat Leaf and Composite objects uniformly:
Leaf objects perform a request directly,
and Composite objects 
forward the request to their child components recursively downwards the tree structure.
This makes client classes easier to implement, change, test, and reuse.

See also the UML class and object diagram below.

Motivation 
When dealing with Tree-structured data, programmers often have to discriminate between a leaf-node and a branch. This makes code more complex, and therefore, more error prone. The solution is an interface that allows treating complex and primitive objects uniformly. In object-oriented programming, a composite is an object designed as a composition of one-or-more similar objects, all exhibiting similar functionality. This is known as a "has-a" relationship between objects. The key concept is that you can manipulate a single instance of the object just as you would manipulate a group of them. The operations you can perform on all the composite objects often have a least common denominator relationship. For example, if defining a system to portray grouped shapes on a screen, it would be useful to define resizing a group of shapes to have the same effect (in some sense) as resizing a single shape.

When to use 
Composite should be used when clients ignore the difference between compositions of objects and individual objects.  If programmers find that they are using multiple objects in the same way, and often have nearly identical code to handle each of them, then composite is a good choice; it is less complex in this situation to treat primitives and composites as homogeneous.

Structure

UML class and object diagram 

In the above UML class diagram, the Client class doesn't refer to the Leaf and Composite classes directly (separately).
Instead, the Client refers to the common Component interface and can treat Leaf and Composite uniformly.

The Leaf class has no children and implements the Component interface directly.

The Composite class maintains a container of child
Component objects (children) and forwards requests
to these children (for each child in children: child.operation()).

The object collaboration diagram 
shows the run-time interactions: In this example, the Client object sends a request to the top-level Composite object (of type Component) in the tree structure.
The request is forwarded to (performed on) all child Component objects 
(Leaf and Composite objects) downwards the tree structure.

Defining Child-Related Operations

There are two design variants for defining and implementing child-related operations
like adding/removing a child component to/from the container (add(child)/remove(child)) and accessing a child component (getChild()):
 Design for uniformity: Child-related operations are defined in the Component interface. This enables clients to treat Leaf and Composite objects uniformly. But type safety is lost because clients can perform child-related operations on Leaf objects.
 Design for type safety: Child-related operations are defined only in the Composite class. Clients must treat Leaf and Composite objects differently. But type safety is gained because clients cannot perform child-related operations on Leaf objects.

The Composite design pattern emphasizes uniformity over type safety.

UML class diagram 

Component
 is the abstraction for all components, including composite ones
 declares the interface for objects in the composition
 (optional) defines an interface for accessing a component's parent in the recursive structure, and implements it if that's appropriate

Leaf
 represents leaf objects in the composition
 implements all Component methods

Composite
 represents a composite Component (component having children)
 implements methods to manipulate children
 implements all Component methods, generally by delegating them to its children

Variation 
As it is described in Design Patterns, the pattern also involves including the child-manipulation methods in the main Component interface, not just the Composite subclass. More recent descriptions sometimes omit these methods.

Example 

The following example, written in Java, implements a graphic class, which can be either an ellipse or a composition of several graphics. Every graphic can be printed. In Backus-Naur form,
        Graphic ::= ellipse | GraphicList
        GraphicList ::= empty | Graphic GraphicList

It could be extended to implement several other shapes (rectangle, etc.) and methods (translate, etc.).

Java 
import java.util.List;
import java.util.ArrayList;

/** "Component" */
interface Graphic {
    //Prints the graphic.
    public void print();
}

/** "Composite" */
class CompositeGraphic implements Graphic {
    //Collection of child graphics.
    private final List<Graphic> childGraphics = new ArrayList<>();

    //Adds the graphic to the composition.
    public void add(Graphic graphic) {
        childGraphics.add(graphic);
    }
    
    //Prints the graphic.
    @Override
    public void print() {
        for (Graphic graphic : childGraphics) {
            graphic.print();  //Delegation
        }
    }
}

/** "Leaf" */
class Ellipse implements Graphic {
    //Prints the graphic.
    @Override
    public void print() {
        System.out.println("Ellipse");
    }
}

/** Client */
class CompositeDemo {
    public static void main(String[] args) {
        //Initialize four ellipses
        Ellipse ellipse1 = new Ellipse();
        Ellipse ellipse2 = new Ellipse();
        Ellipse ellipse3 = new Ellipse();
        Ellipse ellipse4 = new Ellipse();

        //Creates two composites containing the ellipses
        CompositeGraphic compositGraphic2 = new CompositeGraphic();
        compositGraphic2.add(ellipse1);
        compositGraphic2.add(ellipse2);
        compositGraphic2.add(ellipse3);
        
        CompositeGraphic compositGraphic3 = new CompositeGraphic();
        compositGraphic3.add(ellipse4);
        
        //Create another graphics that contains two graphics
        CompositeGraphic compositGraphic = new CompositeGraphic();
        compositGraphic.add(compositGraphic2);
        compositGraphic.add(compositGraphic3);

        //Prints the complete graphic (Four times the string "Ellipse").
        compositGraphic.print();
    }
}

See also
Perl Design Patterns Book
Mixin
Law of Demeter

References

External links 

Composite Pattern implementation in Java
Composite pattern description from the Portland Pattern Repository
Composite pattern in UML and in LePUS3, a formal modelling language
Class::Delegation on CPAN
"The End of Inheritance: Automatic Run-time Interface Building for Aggregated Objects" by Paul Baranowski
PerfectJPattern Open Source Project, Provides componentized implementation of the Composite Pattern in Java
 A persistent Java-based implementation
Composite Design Pattern

Software design patterns
Articles with example Java code
Articles with example C Sharp code